Made in L.A. may refer to:

 Made in L.A. (2007 film), documentary on the garment trade
 Made in L.A. (EP), released in 2014 by Mila J
 Made in L.A., another name for L.A. Takedown, a 1989 TV movie
 Made in L.A., a recurring art exhibit at the Hammer Museum